Joseph McNulty (17 July 1923 – 1986) was an Irish professional footballer who played as a goalkeeper. He played eight matches in the Football League for Burnley, with his league debut coming in the 1–2 defeat to Manchester United on 24 March 1951.

He later played for Bangor, Crusaders and Dundalk.

References

1923 births
1986 deaths
People from Dundalk
Republic of Ireland association footballers
Association football goalkeepers
Ards F.C. players
Burnley F.C. players
Sheffield United F.C. players
New York Hakoah players
English Football League players
Association footballers from County Louth
Bangor F.C. players
Crusaders F.C. players
Dundalk F.C. players